Heather Roy (born 5 March 1964), is a former New Zealand politician who served as an ACT Member of Parliament from 2002 until 2011.

From 2006 until 17 August 2010, Roy was ACT's Deputy Leader. Following the signing of the National–ACT Supply and Confidence Agreement after the 2008 general election she was appointed as Minister (outside Cabinet) of Consumer Affairs, as well as Associate Minister of Defence and Associate Minister of Education. On 17 August 2010, Roy was replaced as Deputy Leader by first term ACT MP John Boscawen who took over her primary Ministerial role. In June 2011, Roy announced that she would retire at the 2011 general election.

Early life
Before entering politics, Roy worked as a physiotherapist, medical research co-ordinator, manager of a private kindergarten and as publicity officer for the New Zealand Portrait Gallery. Following her retirement from Parliament, Roy is now non-executive Chair of Medicines New Zealand and has also resumed her role as a Reserve Forces field engineer in the New Zealand Army.

Member of Parliament

In the 1999 election ACT ranked her tenth on its party list, and she narrowly missed out on a seat in Parliament. In the 2002 election, however, ranked ninth, she won election as a list MP. She also contested the United Future safe seat of Ohariu-Belmont, polling fifth.

In June 2005, she won promotion from ninth list position to second – even before she became the party's deputy leader. In the 2005 election, she again campaigned for ACT party vote and accompanied Rodney Hide through much of his Epsom campaign. However, she also stood in Ohariu-Belmont, coming fifth.

Second term: 2005–2008
In 2006, she completed basic and corps training as a Reserve Forces field engineer (Royal New Zealand Engineers) within the New Zealand Army.

Campaigning solely for party vote, she polled fourth in the electorate count but was re-elected to Parliament on the ACT party list.

Third term: 2008–2011
In November 2008, as part of the Supply and Confidence Agreement between the ACT and National Party which allowed the formation of a Government, Heather Roy was appointed to ministerial posts outside the cabinet as Minister of Consumer Affairs, Associate Defence Minister and Associate Education Minister. Her appointment required her to step down from an active role in the territorials to avoid any conflict of interest.

Following internal party concerns she was removed as deputy leader of the Act Party in August 2010. Her ministerial portfolios were transferred to the new deputy leader, John Boscawen, by the Governor-General following advice from the Prime Minister. Since 17 August 2010, she has assumed the roles of spokesperson on Foreign Affairs, Health, Social Development and Employment, Police, Corrections, Courts, Labour, Science and Innovation, Pacific Affairs, Ethnic Affairs, Arts, Culture and Heritage, Tourism, Sports and Recreation, Youth Affairs and Tertiary Education. She also sat on the Select Committees for Education and Science; Local Government and Environment as well as the Parliamentary Service Commission.

Roy also took charge of a bill submitted by Sir Roger Douglas, The Education (Freedom of Association) Amendment Bill (Voluntary Student Membership), which proposed to make membership of student associations and unions voluntary. The bill eventually passed its third reading in September 2011, and voluntary student membership is now required.

In June 2011, Roy announced her retirement at the 2011 general election.

Career after politics
Following the 2011 election, Roy was appointed non-executive Chair of the Board of the pharmaceutical lobby group, Medicines NZ.

Personal life
Roy and her husband Duncan Roy, a doctor, have five children.

References

Further reading 
 (Roy contributed a paper entitled "Health for all".)

External links
 Official website archive

1964 births
Living people
ACT New Zealand MPs
Women members of the New Zealand House of Representatives
People from Palmerston, New Zealand
New Zealand list MPs
Unsuccessful candidates in the 1999 New Zealand general election
Members of the New Zealand House of Representatives
21st-century New Zealand politicians
21st-century New Zealand women politicians